Paband (also Romanized as Pāband; also known as Pavand) is a village in Sojas Rud Rural District, Sojas Rud District, Khodabandeh County, Zanjan Province, Iran. At the 2006 census, its population was 560, in 134 families.

References 

Populated places in Khodabandeh County